In statistics and image processing, to smooth a data set is to create an approximating function that attempts to capture important patterns in the data, while leaving out noise or other fine-scale structures/rapid phenomena. In smoothing, the data points of a signal are modified so individual points higher than the adjacent points (presumably because of noise) are reduced, and points that are lower than the adjacent points are increased leading to a smoother signal. Smoothing may be used in two important ways that can aid in data analysis (1) by being able to extract more information from the data as long as the assumption of smoothing is reasonable and (2) by being able to provide analyses that are both flexible and robust. Many different algorithms are used in smoothing.

Smoothing may be distinguished from the related and partially overlapping concept of curve fitting in the following ways:
 curve fitting often involves the use of an explicit function form for the result, whereas the immediate results from smoothing are the "smoothed" values with no later use made of a functional form if there is one;
 the aim of smoothing is to give a general idea of relatively slow changes of value with little attention paid to the close matching of data values, while curve fitting concentrates on achieving as close a match as possible.
 smoothing methods often have an associated tuning parameter which is used to control the extent of smoothing. Curve fitting will adjust any number of parameters of the function to obtain the 'best' fit.

Linear smoothers
In the case that the smoothed values can be written as a linear transformation of the observed values, the smoothing operation is known as a linear smoother; the matrix representing the transformation is known as a smoother matrix or hat matrix.

The operation of applying such a matrix transformation is called convolution. Thus the matrix is also called convolution matrix or a convolution kernel. In the case of simple series of data points (rather than a multi-dimensional image), the convolution kernel is a one-dimensional vector.

Algorithms
One of the most common algorithms is the "moving average", often used to try to capture important trends in repeated statistical surveys. In image processing and computer vision, smoothing ideas are used in scale space representations. The simplest smoothing algorithm is the "rectangular" or "unweighted sliding-average smooth". This method replaces each point in the signal with the average of "m" adjacent points, where "m" is a positive integer called the "smooth width". Usually m is an odd number. The triangular smooth is like the rectangular smooth except that it implements a weighted smoothing function.

Some specific smoothing and filter types, with their respective uses, pros and cons are:

See also 
Convolution
Curve fitting
Discretization
Edge preserving smoothing
Filtering (signal processing)
Graph cuts in computer vision
Numerical smoothing and differentiation
Scale space
Scatterplot smoothing
Smoothing spline
Smoothness
Statistical signal processing
Subdivision surface, used in computer graphics
Window function

References

Further reading
 Hastie, T.J. and Tibshirani, R.J. (1990), Generalized Additive Models, New York: Chapman and Hall.

Curve fitting
Statistical charts and diagrams
Time series
Image processing